Pyrenula cruentata is a species of corticolous (bark-dwelling), crustose lichen in the family Pyrenulaceae. The lichen, characterized by its crimson-colored thallus and perithecial warts, has a neotropical distribution.

The lichen was first formally described in 1885 by Swiss botanist Johannes Müller Argoviensis as Bottaria cruentata. Richard Harris transferred it to the genus Pyrenula in 1987.

In northern North America, where its distribution in the United States is limited to southern Florida, it is commonly known as the bark rash lichen. It occurs on the bark of hardwood trees in hammocks and woodlands.

See also
List of Pyrenula species

References

cruentata
Lichen species
Lichens described in 1885
Lichens of the Caribbean
Lichens of the Southeastern United States
Taxa named by Johannes Müller Argoviensis